Murad Dadashov (21 December 1978, Baku, Azerbaijan USSR) is an Azerbaijani actor, producer, TV host, member of Parni iz Baku KVN team and head of M Group Production. In 2014, Murad Dadashov was awarded the title of Honored Artist of the Azerbaijan Republic.27.05.2018 He tittled People Artist of Azerbaijan.

Life and career
Murad Ali oglu Dadashov was born on 21 December 1978 in Baku. His father, Ali Mursel oglu Dadashov, is transport worker by profession. His mother, Tamilla Abuzer gizi Aliyeva, is a musician, a piano teacher. His brother Farid Ali oglu Dadashov is one of the founders of “KOKON” creative agency. Note that the Honored Artist of the Azerbaijan Republic, famous tar player Ahsan Dadashov is Murad Dadashov's father's uncle.

During the years 1985-1995 he went to secondary school No. 160 in Baku. He was invited to “The Guys of Baku” Club of the Funny and Inventive that played a huge role in development of the Azerbaijani youth at the dawn of the 20th century. Thus in December 1993 he stepped on the big and professional stage. In 2000 “The Guys of Baku” team won “Champions of the 20th Century” title. Murad Dadashov was the part of the winning team.

In 1996-2000 Dadashov studied at the faculty of “Social Sciences and Psychology” at Baku State University. He is psychologist by education. While studying at the university (1999–2002) he also served as deputy director at the Center for Independent Sociological Studies “Prognoz” (Forecast).

Murad Dadashov's first television work started in the mid-1990s at the Azerbaijan Television and Radio Broadcasting Closed Joint Stock Company. Together with another member of “The Guys of Baku” Club of the Funny and Inventive Jabir Imanov he produced a project under the title “Bir cənub şəhərində” (Once upon a time in a southern city).

In the late 1990s he was the host of "Road Master", a project on Space TV. Since January 2002 to October of the same year he was acted as General Producer at the “ANS” Independent Broadcasting Media Company. At the same time, he hosted the daily show “Yeriniz Məlum” (Wish you could join us) broadcast on this channel.

On February 7, 2003, Dadashovlaid the foundation of MGP (M Group Production)  company. Here he filled a post of General Manager until 2008. First project of the company was “Mərc Şou” (“Make a Bet” Show) that was broadcast on Lider TV in 2003. In 2005 the same channel broadcast “Maşın” (The Car) reality-show. Murad Dadashov was the author and host of both of projects. In 2008-2010 he has been appointed to position of General Producer at “Lider Media Holdinq” - Lider TV.

He has been the President of MGP (M Group Production)  company since 2010.

MGP (M Group Production)  attracts all its creative power and potential to the development of each project. Found on the innovative methods in the ideas presented, through application of interesting trends the company always continues to be relevant.

Over the recent years Dadashov in recent years acted as a jury and professional expert in many projects that are broadcast nowadays. He was among the juries in “Yeni ulduz” (New star) music competition on Azad Azerbaijan (ATV) TV from 2004 to 2011, “Пять звезд. Интервидение 2008” (Five Stars. Intervision-2008) song contest held in Sochi in 2008, “Böyük Səhnə” (Big Stage) singing show on Public Television in 2014 and “Özünü Tanıt” (Got talent) talent show broadcast on Azad Azerbaijan (ATV) TV in 2015.
  
Under President Ilham Aliyev's decree from December 18, 2014, Dadashov was awarded the title of the Honored Artist of the Azerbaijan Republic “For his merits to the development of Azerbaijani culture”.

In 2001 he married Ayten Elkhan gizi Dadashova, an orientalist by profession. He has 3 sons Kamal Murad oglu Dadashov (20.11.2001), Ali Murad oglu Dadashov (14.03.2005) and Ziya Murad oglu Dadashov  (03.12.2010).

Films
 National bomb (Milli bomba, 2004)
 Hard way (Çətin yol, 2006)
 Once upon a time in Caucasus (Bir dəfə Qafqazda, 2007)
 Honesty monies (Halal pullar, 2008)
 Don't worry, i am with you (Qorxma, mən səninləyəm! 1919, 2014)
 Festive evening (Bayram axşamı, 2017)

External links
 http://news.lent.az/news/144137
 http://boyuksehne.com/az/interviews-Marad-Dadashov-az/
 https://parkcinema.az/movies/view/4097/bayram-axsami
 http://www.trend.az/life/interview/891839.html
 http://www.aznews.az/index.php?c=news&id=84135
 http://www.trend.az/azerbaijan/baku2015/2412950.html
 http://www.1news.az/bomond/20110112024530110.html
 http://www.1news.az/bomond/20110209091805952.html
 http://news.day.az/society/515725.html
 http://musavat.com/news/strana/murad-dadashev-virazil-blaqodarnost-prezidentu-foto_263547.html
 http://amornews.az/post/5455
 http://baku.ws/43878-murad-dadashov-s-synom-v-proekte-zhurnala-nargis-deti-govoryat-video.html

1978 births
Living people
Azerbaijani television presenters
Azerbaijani television producers
20th-century Azerbaijani male actors
21st-century Azerbaijani male actors